Old College may refer to:
 Old College, Aberystwyth, in Wales
 Old College, University of Edinburgh, in Scotland
 Old College (Northwestern University), in Illinois, United States
 Old College, University of Notre Dame, in Indiana, United States
 Old College Lawn Tennis and Croquet Club, in London, England
 Nevada School of Law at Old College, in the United States

See also
 Olds College, in Olds, Alberta, Canada